Eugene Mark Kayden (1886–1977) was a professor emeritus of economics at Sewanee: The University of the South and a translator of Boris Pasternak's poems. Kayden, a pro-integrationist, declined an honorary degree from the university in protest of its decision to award another degree to noted segregationist Thomas R. Waring.

Works 

 The Co-operative Movement in Russia during the War (1929), co-authored with Alexis N. Antsiferov

Translations into English 

 Poems by Boris Pasternak (1959, 1964 2nd ed.)
 Alexander Pushkin's Eugene Onegin (1964)
 Alexander Pushkin's Little Tragedies (1965)
 Michail Lermontov's The Demon and Other Poems (1965)
 Fyodor Tyutchev's Poems of Night and Day (1974)
 Last Translations; Russian Poems (1979)
 Vsevolod Garshin's Last Translations; Three Stories (1979)

References

External links 

 Eugene M. Kayden Awards

1886 births
1977 deaths
Sewanee: The University of the South faculty